Griffin Jones may refer to:

Griffin Jones, character in Dark Matter (2015 TV series)
Griffin Jones, character in Ejecta (film)

See also

Griffith Jones (disambiguation)